Ricardo Antonio Álvarez Arias (born 4 February 1963) is the former mayor of Tegucigalpa and the former First Vice President of Honduras. 

He ran for Mayor of Tegucigalpa and won the 2005 elections and was re-elected on the 2009 elections representing the National Party of Honduras. In 2012, Álvarez ran for the National Party nomination for president, ultimately losing to Juan Orlando Hernández. Hernández named him his vice presidential candidate, and together they won the 2013 elections. He is named in the trial for links to the Los Cachiros cartel.

References 

|-

 
|-

Living people
1963 births
Mayors of places in Honduras
National Party of Honduras politicians
Vice presidents of Honduras
People named in the Pandora Papers